David Charles Goelz (born July 16, 1946) is an American puppeteer and puppet builder known for his work with the Muppets. As part of the Muppets' performing cast, Goelz performs Gonzo the Great, as well as Dr. Bunsen Honeydew, Waldorf (after Jim Henson's death), Zoot and Beauregard, originating on The Muppet Show. Goelz's puppeteering roles also included in Fraggle Rock, The Dark Crystal, and Labyrinth. Outside of puppeteering work, he was also the voice of Figment in the Journey into Imagination with Figment attraction at Epcot.

Early life 
Born in Los Angeles, California, Goelz had an interest in puppetry as a child, including an affinity for the children's television show Time for Beany, but after graduating from John Burroughs High School in Burbank, he attended the Los Angeles Art Center College of Design and began work as an industrial designer. The mechanically-minded Goelz worked for such companies as John Deere, American Airlines, and Hewlett-Packard. However, when Sesame Street premiered, he was fascinated by the craftsmanship, as he recalled in an interview: 

While working full-time for an electronics firm, Goelz began dabbling with puppet building.

Career

Muppet building
He met Frank Oz at a puppetry festival in 1972, and during a vacation in New York City, he attended daily Sesame Street tapings. A few months later, Goelz showed his design portfolio to Jim Henson, and in 1973, he was offered a job with Henson Associates as a part-time puppet builder. His first assignment was to build puppets and design effects for a proposed Broadway show. However, the show was soon abandoned in favor of an ABC pilot, The Muppets Valentine Show, for which Goelz built characters and got his first chance at performing, playing Brewster, whom he also designed.

Upon Goelz's return to California, he learned that he had been replaced by his electronics employer, so he set up shop creating puppets and videos for industrial videos. Eight months later, in the fall of 1974, Henson offered him a full-time position as a builder/designer, and occasional performer in specials, while still allowing him to keep his industrial clients. Returning to New York, Goelz began work on The Muppet Show: Sex and Violence, for which he built the new host character, Nigel. Working from sketches by Jim Henson, Michael K. Frith, and Bonnie Erickson, he also built Animal, Floyd Pepper, and Zoot, the latter becoming his first major character.

The Muppet Show and the birth of Gonzo
In 1976, Goelz joined the rest of the Henson team and flew to London to begin work on The Muppet Show. In addition to reprising his role of Zoot and playing background roles, as in the earlier specials, Goelz was promoted to "Principal Muppet Performer" with the starring role of The Great Gonzo. The puppet had debuted in The Great Santa Claus Switch, as Cigar Box Frackle, and had made brief appearances in Muppet Meeting Films and Herb Alpert & the Tijuana Brass, with different performers. The sad-eyed creation was now given a permanent name and puppeteer. However, in addition to playing Gonzo, Goelz was still employed in the Muppet Workshop.

Goelz recalled the hectic schedule of working full-time behind the scenes and in front of the cameras in a 2004 Film Threat interview:

Gonzo, that first season, like many of the new Muppet Show creations, was a work in progress, and especially for Goelz, playing his first starring character and major speaking role. When he was assigned the character, he panicked: "I have no voice!"

He thought of the voice the morning before the first taping performance. As recalled later, Goelz thought that he had the worst voice out of all the Muppet performers, and was scared the first time he had to sing.

The early Gonzo, with a permanently sad expression, inspired a similarly depressed portrayal from the novice puppeteer: "The downcast eyes made him easy to play because that was exactly how I felt. I was an impostor in show business. I was learning how to perform and to puppeteer on the job."

In that first season, Gonzo was a misfit and out of place, according to Goelz, which was how he saw himself as a performer: 

Looking at the character in retrospect at MuppetFest, he recalled that "over the years, he sort of evolved along with me... I was an impostor in show business. In the first season, Gonzo is always self-effacing and embarrassed. But he knows he has something special." Adding to Goelz's insecurity was the jaded veteran crew members of ATV Studios, who had worked with the likes of Julie Andrews and Bing Crosby, and were thus hard to impress.

Finally, towards the end of the first season, Gonzo had a scene where he had to shout, in amazement, "No!" Jim Henson told him to go bigger, so Goelz obliged with an overemphatic "NO!" This earned his first laugh from the crewmembers.

As Goelz increased in confidence, and Gonzo transitioned from a nervous depressed failure to a manic, confident stuntman, other facets of the character fell into place. The second season introduces his romantic fascination with poultry. As the performer reminisced in Of Muppets and Men:

Other Muppets 
In addition to the starring role of Gonzo, during the first season of The Muppet Show, Goelz also had the slightly less challenging but still time-consuming supporting roles of Zoot and another new creation, scientist Dr. Bunsen Honeydew.

In later seasons, a new Goelz character was added, the well-meaning but slow-witted janitor, Beauregard:

Fraggle Rock
With the debut of Fraggle Rock, Goelz was cast as one of the five leads, the depressed, pessimistic Boober Fraggle. Boober stemmed from something Goelz had said while working on the first season of The Muppet Show, that he was so busy on the show that the only things he had time to worry about were death and laundry. At Muppetfest, Goelz related the process of character creation for the show: "They looked at the performers, and picked out our flaws, and made characters out of them. They denied it... So that's how I ended up with Boober, the superstitious, paranoid character." In the Fraggle Rock: Complete First Season interviews, Goelz also mentioned that "I was cast with Boober, who was sort of grumpy and inflexible, just like I could be a lot of the time." Demonstrating his versatility, he also played the pompous Uncle Traveling Matt, the rat-like Philo, and the cantankerous World's Oldest Fraggle, as well as a variety of guest characters and memorable incidentals, such as Wrench, Cotterpin Doozer's best friend, the obese Large Marvin and Sidebottom, Boober's more jovial alter-ego from his dreams. In the Fraggle Rock: Complete Second Season interviews, Goelz talked about how he developed Traveling Matt's character, from the starting point as Matt being simply a misinterpreting chronicler of human life, to determining that Matt was also inherently clumsy and inept, which led to Matt covering up his blunders in his postcards and developing a comedic air of ostentation. Goelz reprised his roles as the voices of Boober and Travelling Matt in the 2020 Apple TV+ spin-off series Fraggle Rock: Rock On!; the two characters were puppeteered by John Tartaglia, who also puppeteered Wembley (to Frankie Cordero's vocals) and performs Gobo (a role he inherited from Jerry Nelson).

Films and beyond
Goelz continued to reprise his roles as Gonzo and Bunsen in feature films, slowly adding more aspects to "the weirdo," and also worked on Henson's forays into "realistic" fantasy, The Dark Crystal (performing the Garthim Master SkekUng and the dog-like Fizzgig), and Labyrinth (playing a variety of roles, notably Sir Didymus). 
 

As the 1980s progressed, in addition to switching between the manic Gonzo and the phlegmatic Boober (a variety which Goelz recalled as "stimulating"), Goelz played occasional new roles in specials, notably Rugby Tiger in The Christmas Toy:  Another new character was Digit in The Jim Henson Hour.

Goelz also provided the puppetry for Kermit the Frog for Muppets Most Wanted test footage.

Other roles
Following Jim Henson's sudden death in 1990, and with Frank Oz continuing to focus heavily on directing, Gonzo the character and Goelz the performer gained increased significance, starting with the first new feature, The Muppet Christmas Carol. By performing Gonzo as Charles Dickens as narrator, Goelz (accompanied by Steve Whitmire as Rizzo the Rat, a pairing which would be repeated in subsequent productions) largely dominated the Muppet side of the film, and received top billing as "Muppet Performer" (a distinction which would continue through Muppet Treasure Island and Muppets from Space) "...when we did The Muppet Christmas Carol, he [Gonzo] developed a soulful side. He played the part of Dickens, and I just loved doing that. It just paralleled my own growth. Jerry Juhl wrote it as a way of getting Dickensian prose into the movie. But the fact that he chose Gonzo was very satisfying to me. And I think it was because he saw me changing and I think he felt that Gonzo could change too" (Film Threat). Goelz also took over the part of Waldorf from Henson. Muppets From Space was both Gonzo the character and Goelz the performer's first leading role in a Muppet production.

Apart from a brief stint operating the face of Earl Sinclair and performing hand-puppet guest characters on Dinosaurs, and reprising Rugby in The Secret Life of Toys, Goelz' most notable new television character was Stinky the Skunk in Jim Henson's Animal Show. Otherwise, the puppeteer remained mostly occupied with Gonzo in movies, videos, and the 1996 series Muppets Tonight, the latter introducing a few new characters such as Randy Pig and Bill the Bubble Guy. Goelz also performed a handful of minor Sesame Street characters and appeared in The Adventures of Elmo in Grouchland as Humongous Chicken. His most recent credits include The Muppets' Wizard of Oz and the first few installments of the online series Statler and Waldorf: From the Balcony. In 2011 and 2014, he reprised his performance as Gonzo, Dr. Bunsen Honeydew, Zoot, Waldorf, Beauregard and other signature roles in The Muppets and Muppets Most Wanted. In 2015, Goelz voiced Subconscious Guard Frank in the Disney·Pixar film Inside Out. He also voiced Baffi the Fizzgig in the 2019 Netflix original series The Dark Crystal: Age of Resistance.

Personal life 
Over the years, Goelz has suffered a number of injuries due to the way Muppet performers must hold up their arms for extended periods and contort into small spaces. These include four shoulder surgeries and a hip replacement.

At 46, he married his wife Debra, who was formerly a Jim Henson Productions VP of Finance, and subsequently had two children. They live on a forested 20-acre space in Northern California.

Filmography
The Parent Trap: Extra 
The Muppet Show: Gonzo the Great, Zoot, Dr. Bunsen Honeydew, Beauregard, Alfredo the Mop Dancer, Ali Baba, Alien, Avocado, Banananose Moldenado, Baskerville the Hound (episode 524), Behemoth (episode 115), Billy the Bear (episode 412), Brewster, Brown Bat, Bullets Barker, Dr. Salamander, Geri and the Atrics (Drummer), The Gingerbread Men, The Gogolala Jubilee Jugband (Blue Whatnot), Gorgon Heap (episode 119), Inspector LaBrea, Johnny, Kermit the Pig, Klaus Mueller, Koozebanian Spooble, Lenny the Lizard (episode 103), Sundance, Lubbock Lou, Luis Greco, Luncheon Counter Monster (occasionally), Mackerel, Matador, Mean Mama (episode 202), Mildred Huxtetter (episode 115), Miss Kitty (episodes 101, 103 and 107), Mr. Dawson, Muppy, Otto the Automatic Entertainer, Paul Revere (legs), Rabbi, Righton Bird, Salzburg Sauerkraut Singer, Signor Baffi, Timmy Monster (occasionally), Tom, Dick, and Harry (Dick), Walter Tell, Warthog, Wig Trainer, Additional Muppets
Sesame Street: China Shop Clerk, Elephant, Humongous Chicken, Mr. Between, Piño, Rocky, Tom Piper's son, the Lavender Royal Sycophant
The Muppet Show: Sex and Violence: Avarice, Brewster, Zoot, Righton Bird, The San Francisco Earthquake
The Muppet Movie: Gonzo, Dr. Bunsen Honeydew, Zoot, Doglion, Beauregard, Wendell Porcupine, Pop-eyed Catfish 
The Great Muppet Caper: Gonzo, Dr. Bunsen Honeydew, Zoot, Beauregard, Lubbock Lou
The Muppets Take Manhattan: Gonzo, Zoot, Bill, Chester Rat, Beauregard, Dr. Bunsen Honeydew, Penguin, Dog
Inner Tube: Jake (unaired television pilot)
The Jim Henson Hour: Gonzo, Digit, Oznog, Tigid, Stunt Cat, Additional Muppets
The Muppet Christmas Carol: Gonzo (as Charles Dickens), Waldorf (as Robert Marley), Betina Cratchit, Dr. Bunsen Honeydew
Muppet Treasure Island: Gonzo, Waldorf (as Figurehead of the Hispaniola), Dr. Bunsen Honeydew (as Dr. Livesay), Zoot, Mudwell the Mudbunny
A Muppet Family Christmas: Gonzo, Dr. Bunsen Honeydew, Zoot, Beauregard, Boober Fraggle, Uncle Traveling Matt
Muppets Tonight: Gonzo, Waldorf, Randy Pig, Beauregard, Artie, Baby Kramer, Bill the Bubble Guy, Bud, Cupid, Dr. Pain, Elvises, Gary Cahuenga, Jean-Dodd van Clamme, Morty, Purple Extreme (puppetry and speaking voice), Purple Rain Man, Stu, Additional Muppets
Rudy Coby: The Coolest Magician on Earth: Gonzo (as Gonzo the Great)
Fraggle Rock: Boober Fraggle, Clerk Fraggle, Large Marvin Fraggle, Philo, Uncle Traveling Matt, 7-Words-Max, Sidebottom, Skenfrith, World's Oldest Fraggle, Wrench Doozer
The Christmas Toy: Rugby Tiger
The Dark Crystal: Fizzgig, SkekUng (both puppetry only)
Labyrinth: Firey 3, Left Door Knocker, One of The Four Guards, Sir Didymus, Wiseman's Hat (all puppetry only)
Emmet Otter's Jug-Band Christmas: Wendell Porcupine, Will Possum, Pop-eyed Catfish
The Animal Show: Stinky the Skunk
Dinosaurs: Earl Sinclair (face, through Episode 207), Grapdelite (Episode 205), General Chow (puppeteer, Episode 207)
Bear in the Big Blue House: Jack the Dog (Episode 325: A Berry Bear Christmas part 1 and Episode 326: A Berry Bear Christmas part 2)
Muppet Sing Alongs: It's Not Easy Being Green: Gonzo, Wendell Porcupine
Muppet Meeting Films: Big Mean Carl, Franklin ("The Meeting That Would Not Die"), Mulligan
The Secret Life of Toys: Rugby Tiger
Wow, You're a Cartoonist!: Gonzo
The Muppets at Walt Disney World: Gonzo, Dr. Bunsen Honeydew, Beauregard, Zoot
Muppet*Vision 3D: Gonzo, Dr. Bunsen Honeydew, Zoot, Beauregard
Muppet Classic Theater: Gonzo, Randy Pig, Waldorf, Dr. Bunsen Honeydew, Zoot
Muppets From Space: Gonzo, Dr. Bunsen Honeydew, Zoot, Waldorf, The Swedish Chef, Birdman
The Adventures of Elmo in Grouchland: Humongous Chicken
Muppet RaceMania: Gonzo, Dr. Bunsen Honeydew, Waldorf, Beauregard, Zoot
Kermit's Swamp Years: Waldorf
It's a Very Merry Muppet Christmas Movie: Gonzo, Dr. Bunsen Honeydew, Waldorf
Muppets Party Cruise: Gonzo, Dr. Bunsen Honeydew, Waldorf, Zoot, Digit, Randy Pig
Statler and Waldorf: From the Balcony: Waldorf (ep. 1–8)
Kermit: A Frog's Life: Gonzo, Waldorf, Dr. Bunsen Honeydew, (also archive footage as Statler and Waldorf)
The Muppets' Wizard of Oz: Gonzo, Dr. Bunsen Honeydew, Waldorf, Zoot, Audience Member at Aunt Em's Diner (on-screen cameo)
The Muppet Show: Season One (main menus): WaldorfThe Muppets on Muppets: Gonzo
Disney Xtreme Digital: Gonzo, Dr. Bunsen Honeydew, Waldorf, Penguins, Singing Food, Beauregard
Virmup: Gonzo, Dr. Bunsen Honeydew, Beauregard, Pumpkins, Rabbits
Studio DC: Almost Live: Gonzo, Zoot, Waldorf, Dr. Bunsen Honeydew, Pancake the Water Buffalo
A Muppets Christmas: Letters to Santa: Gonzo, Waldorf, Dr. Bunsen Honeydew, Zoot
The Muppets Kitchen with Cat Cora: Gonzo, Dr. Bunsen Honeydew, Beauregard, Randy Pig
WWE Raw: Gonzo, Dr. Bunsen Honeydew, Waldorf
The Muppets: Gonzo, Dr. Bunsen Honeydew, Zoot, Waldorf, Beauregard, Kermit Moopet
Muppets Most Wanted: Gonzo, Dr. Bunsen Honeydew, Zoot, Waldorf, Beauregard, Baby, Penguin
Inside Out: Subconscious Guard Frank (voice)
The Muppets: Gonzo, Dr. Bunsen Honeydew, Waldorf, Zoot, Chip, Randy Pig
The Muppets Present...Great Moments in American History: Gonzo (voice, theme park show at Magic Kingdom)
The Muppets Take the Bowl: Gonzo, Dr. Bunsen Honeydew, Zoot, Waldorf, Chip, Beauregard (Live show at the Hollywood Bowl, Sept. 8–10, 2017)
The Muppets Take the O2: Gonzo, Dr. Bunsen Honeydew, Zoot, Waldorf, Chip, Beauregard (Live show at the O2, Jul. 13–14, 2018)
Ask the StoryBots: Mr. Caterpillar 
The Dark Crystal: Age of Resistance: Baffi
Prop Culture: Himself, Episode: "The Muppet Movie"
Muppets Now: Gonzo, Dr. Bunsen Honeydew, Waldorf, Chip, Beauregard, Zoot
Muppets Haunted Mansion: Gonzo, Dr. Bunsen Honeydew, Waldorf, Beauregard, Randy Pig, Chip, Zoot
The Muppets Christmas Caroling Coach: Gonzo, Dr. Bunsen Honeydew, Waldorf (voices, theme park show at Disneyland during Disney Merriest Nights in 2021) 
Fraggle Rock: Back to the Rock: Boober Fraggle, Uncle Traveling Matt, The World's Oldest Fraggle (voices only)
Storybots: Answer Time: Doink

References

External links

1946 births
Living people
American male voice actors
American puppeteers
Art Center College of Design alumni
Fraggle Rock performers
Muppet performers
Primetime Emmy Award winners
Sesame Street Muppeteers